The Mk III Helmet is a steel military combat helmet that was first developed for the British Army in 1941 by the Medical Research Council. They were issued to troops in April 1944 and then worn in combat for the first time by British and Canadian troops on D-Day. Mk III and Mk IV helmets were used alongside the Brodie helmet for the remainder of the Second World War. It is sometimes referred to as the "turtle" helmet by collectors, because of its vague resemblance to a turtle shell, as well as the 1944 pattern helmet.

Design
The Mark III helmet was designed to provide better protection for the side of the head than its predecessor. It was a deeper helmet with a smaller brim and provided 38% more protection than the Mark II, particularly at the sides (total area of head protection was increased by 12%, horizontal protection was increased by 15% and from items falling from overhead by 11%). The Mark III helmet was issued primarily to assault troops for the Normandy invasion in June 1944, and a large number of helmets from British stocks were issued to the 3rd Canadian Infantry Division in addition to British units. Small numbers also went to the 2nd and 4th Canadian Divisions. All Mark III helmets in Canadian stores were returned to the UK shortly after the end of World War II.

The Mk III gradually replaced the Brodie helmet from 1944 onwards. The Mk III was itself replaced after the war by the Mark IV helmet, which it closely resembled. The differences were that the rivets attaching the chinstrap to the helmet were placed much lower down on the shell and the use of a "lift-the-dot" fastener for the liner. These modifications allowed the Mk IV to be utilised for carrying water. In 1959 a new, more padded, liner was introduced into service but the steel helmet body was unchanged. Hence, the title of the helmet (at least in British army stores catalogues) remained the MK IV. In 1985 the nylon fibre Mark 6 helmet was introduced into service to replace the MK IV, although it was some years before the issue was universal.

Production

Although designed in 1941, due to production issues, the helmet was not manufactured until late 1943. It was produced by three manufacturers in the UK:

Helmet manufacture commenced in November 1943 until early 1945 when production shifted to the MK IV helmets. Mk III helmets were initially painted with textured khaki green colour, later replaced by a  textured dark brown.

Post-war manufactured helmets

The Belgians produced the MkIII helmet post war,  Most known examples are dated 1951 and the liner bears a manufacturers name of Sartel , date and size in metric girth printed in white ink.  There is no embossing on the crossed straps.

The Belgian-produced helmet has no stainless steel parts. The chin strap clips and the rim that are normally Stainless steel on a British helmet are a carbon steel on the Belgian version.

The Belgian helmets do not have any manufacturer's stamp or date on the shell.

The Belgian helmet is a few millimeters longer, front to back, than its British Counterpart.  The liner uses brown, not black leather in its construction.

The Helmet has the same country flag decal on the left hand side as the MkII and the M51 (US M1 Euro-clone) helmets that the Belgians also made.

Post-war refurbished helmets
It is possible to find a war-time dated Mk III that was later fitted with the 'lift the dot' liner. These refurbishments generally took place in the 1950s.

References

External links
 Mk III helmet at world-war-helmets.com

Combat helmets of the United Kingdom
World War II military equipment of the United Kingdom
British Army equipment
Canadian military uniforms
Combat helmets of Canada
Military equipment introduced from 1940 to 1944